The Two-boys competition of the bobsleigh events at the 2012 Winter Youth Olympics in Innsbruck, Austria, was held on January 22, at the Olympic Sliding Centre Innsbruck. 20 athletes from 10 different countries took part in this event.

Results
The runs was started at 11:30.

References

Bobsleigh at the 2012 Winter Youth Olympics